Banknotes with the denomination of 10 dollars have been issued by a number of countries; see the following articles:
 United States ten-dollar bill
 Australian ten-dollar note
 Canadian ten-dollar note
 New Zealand ten-dollar note
 Banknotes of the Hong Kong dollar